Qalqachi (also Romanized as Qālqāchī and Qolqāchī; also known as Ghalghachi, Kolgachi, Kūlgachī, Kulkachi, and Kūlqāshī) is a village in Anzal-e Shomali Rural District, Anzal District, Urmia County, West Azerbaijan Province, Iran. At the 2006 census, its population was 269, in 73 families.

References 

Populated places in Urmia County